Adamar Francisco Caravetti (born 4 February 1945) is a Brazilian former footballer who competed in the 1964 Summer Olympics.

References

External links 
 

1945 births
Living people
Association football forwards
Brazilian footballers
Olympic footballers of Brazil
Footballers at the 1964 Summer Olympics
Sociedade Esportiva Palmeiras players